Law-lin Tsi (1924  2015) was a former Chinese actress and Cantonese opera singer from Hong Kong. Tsi is credited with over 140 films.

Early life 
In 1924, Tsi was born as Chow Kit Lin in Yunfu, Guangdong province, China.

Career 
At age 12, Tsi learned Cantonese opera. In 1937, at age 14, Tsi started her Cantonese opera singing career with Tai Ping Opera Troupe and Kok Sin Sing Opera Troupe. In 1939, Tsi crossed over as an actress in Hong Kong films. Tsi first appeared in Eighth Heaven, a 1939 film and in Rivals in Love, a 1939 film. Tsi also appeared in One Hundred Thousand Children's Corpses, a 1940 Cantonese opera film directed by But Fu. In 1952, Tsi co-founded Union Film Enterprises Ltd, a film production company. Tsi appeared as Ming Fung in Family, a 1953 Historical Drama film directed by Ng Wui, and it was a film debut for Union Film Enterprise. Tsi also appeared as a lead actress in In the Face of Demolition, a 1953 Drama film directed by Lee Tit. Tsi founded Tsi Lo Lin Film Company. In 1954, Tsi became a writer, director, producer, and lead actress in Love in Malaya (aka Malaya Love Affair), a Drama film. Tsi is known for her role as a demure lady or a period beautiful wife. In 1964, Tsi retired from the film. Tsi's last film was The Flying Killer (aka The Female Chivalry), a 1966 Fantasy Action Science Fiction film directed by Chien Lung. Tsi is credited with over 140 films.

Filmography

Films 
This is a partial list of films.
 1939 Eighth Heaven 
 1939 Rivals in Love 
 1940 One Hundred Thousand Children's Corpses
 1941 Bridge of Jealousy 
 1948 Return of the Swallows - Wong Oi-Ming 
 1953 Family - Ming Fung
 1954 In the Face of Demolition 
 1954 Love in Malaya (aka Malaya Love Affair) - Leung Yuk Git, also as writer, director, and producer 
 1954 Sworn Sisters - Ying.
 1955 The Lone Swan 
 1956 The Dunce Attends a Birthday Party - 3rd Sister.
 1956 The Precious Lotus Lamp - Holy Mother of Mount Hua 
 1957 Hen-pecked Husband 
 1957 The Splendour of Youth - Han Xiangying 
 1966 The Flying Killer (aka The Female Chivalry)

Awards 
 Star. Avenue of Stars. Tsim Sha Tsui waterfront in Hong Kong.

Personal life 
In 1950-51, Tsi traveled to Malaya during a theatre tour. Tsi had three daughters. In the 1960s, Tsi lived with her daughters in Seattle, Washington. In 2011, Tsi lived in Canada. On December 24, 2015, Tsi died in Hong Kong.

References

External links 
 Law Lin Tsz at imdb.com
 Tsi Law Lin at hkcinemagic.com
 Zi Luolian at dianying.com
 The Cinema of Lee Sun-fung - Preface at lcsd.gov.hk

1924 births
2015 deaths
Hong Kong Cantonese opera actresses
Hong Kong film actresses
Chinese emigrants to British Hong Kong